The 10th European Cross Country Championships were held at Edinburgh in Scotland on 14 December 2003. Serhiy Lebid took his fourth title in the men's competition and Paula Radcliffe her second title in the women's race.

Results

Men individual 10.095km

Men teams

Women individual 6.595km

Women teams

Junior men individual 6.595km

Junior men teams

Junior women individual 4.52 km

Junior women teams

References

External links 
 Database containing all results between 1994–2007

European Cross Country Championships
European Cross Country Championships
International sports competitions in Edinburgh
2003 in Scottish sport
Cross country running in the United Kingdom
2000s in Edinburgh